Wojtek Fibak and Tom Okker were the defending champions, but Okker did not participate this year.  Fibak partnered Heinz Günthardt, losing in the semifinals.

Peter Fleming and John McEnroe won the title, defeating Brian Gottfried and Raúl Ramírez 6–3, 7–6 in the final.

Seeds

Draw

Finals

Top half

Bottom half

References
Draw

U.S. Pro Indoor
1980 Grand Prix (tennis)